Aditya Narendra Garhwal (born 15 April 1996) is an Indian cricketer who has played Under-16, Under-19 cricket for Rajasthan team. He has played List A and Twenty20 cricket for the Rajasthan cricket team. He is coached by former Rajasthan batsman Anshu Jain. His batting performances in the 2014/15 Vinoo Mankad Trophy has received appreciation from many current and former Indian cricketers. He is often referred as Chota Sehwag for his attacking batting style. He is currently playing for Rajasthan. He was also picked by Kolkata Knight Riders in Indian Premier League 2015.

He made his first-class debut on 11 January 2020, for Rajasthan in the 2019–20 Ranji Trophy.

References

External links 
 

1996 births
Living people
Indian cricketers
Rajasthan cricketers
People from Sikar